Adolphe-Simon Neboux (1806–1844) was a French surgeon and naturalist who accompanied the frigate Vénus under command of Admiral Abel Aubert du Petit-Thouars between the years 1836 and 1839, visiting the Pacific coastline of North America and the Galápagos Islands.

Among species he described are the swallow-tailed gull and the white-capped fruit-dove. In the Galapagos, he collected specimens of the Galápagos dove, Galápagos martin, medium ground finch and the common cactus finch — these specimens were later presented to the Museum d'Histoire Naturelle in 1839. He is honoured in the scientific name of the blue-footed booby (Sula nebouxii).

Works associated with Adolphe-Simon Neboux 
 Description d'oiseaux nouveaux recueillis pendant l'expedition de la Venus. (1840), Revue Zoologique 3 : 289–291.
 Les journaux de bord du "chirurgien naviguan" Adolphe-Simon Neboux (author: Claudine Rigaudeau-Privat, ed. Jean-Pierre Kernéis),  Université de Nantes, (1978).

References

1806 births
1844 deaths
French ornithologists
French naturalists